Trigonopterus misellus is a species of flightless weevil in the genus Trigonopterus from Indonesia.

Etymology
The specific name is derived from the Latin word misellus, meaning "poor".

Description
Individuals measure 2.30–2.65 mm in length.  Body is slightly oval in shape.  General coloration is black, with rust-colored tarsi and antennae.

Range
The species is found around elevations of  around Pedada Bay in the Indonesian province of Lampung.

Phylogeny
T. misellus is part of the subgenus Mimidotasia.

References

misellus
Beetles described in 2014
Beetles of Asia
Insects of Indonesia